The Roaring 20s is an American drama television series starring Rex Reason, Donald May and Dorothy Provine that was broadcast by the American Broadcasting Company (ABC) from October 15, 1960, until January 20, 1962.

Synopsis
Each episode of the series is an hour long. It concerns newspaper reporters reporting crime and gangsters for the fictitious newspaper The New York Record during the 1920s, such as Scott Norris (Rex Reason), Pat Garrison (Donald May), Duke Williams (John Dehner), and copy-boy Chris Higby (Gary Vinson). Mike Road played police Lieutenant Joe Switoski. Dorothy Provine features as Pinky Pinkham, the singer at the Charleston Club, in all 45 episodes.  Other major actors were James Flavin as Robert Howard and Louise Glenn as Gladys, who appear in 33 and 30 episodes, respectively.

Episodes

Season 1: 1960–61

Season 2: 1961–62

Guest stars

 Claude Akins
 Chris Alcaide
 Mario Alcalde
 Max Baer, Jr.
 Parley Baer
 Baynes Barron
 Don "Red" Barry
 Eddie Bracken
 Robert Carricart
 Jack Carter
 Jack Collins
 Ronnie Dapo
 Sam Gilman
 Clark Howat
 Shirley Knight
 Joseph Mell
 Roger Moore
 John Nolan
 Gregg Palmer
 Wynn Pearce
 Gigi Perreau
 Sherwood Price
 Penny Santon
 Henry Slate
 Harry Dean Stanton
 Lyle Talbot
 Jesse White
 Keenan Wynn

Soundtrack album

In 1960 Warner Bros. Records issued the soundtrack album The Roaring 20's to accompany the series (The full album title was: Music from The Roaring 20's Warner Bros. New Hit Television Show, Songs by Dorothy Provine and the Music of Pinky and Her Playboys). Musical direction was by Sandy Courage.

Track listing
 "Crazy Words, Crazy Tune"; "Bye Bye Blackbird"; "Whisper Song"; "Laugh Clown Laugh"
 "Charleston"; "Doin' the Raccoon"; "Black Bottom"
 "I Wanna Be Loved by You"; "Someone to Watch Over Me"; "Don't Bring Lulu"
 "Mountain Greenery"; "Sweet Georgia Brown"
 "Poor Butterfly"; "Let's Misbehave"; "Avalon"
 "O-oo Ernest"; "Clap Hands! Here Comes Charley!"; "Do, Do, Do"
 "I'm Looking Over a Four Leaf Clover"; "A Cup of Coffee, a Sandwich and You"; "Tea for Two"; "The Girl Friend"
 "It Had to Be You"; "Just a Memory"; "Barney Google"
 "I'm Forever Blowing Bubbles"; "Limehouse Blues"
 "Am I Blue?"; "Let's Do It"; "Nagasaki"; "The Roaring Twenties"

Notes

External links

 
 

1960 American television series debuts
1962 American television series endings
1960s American drama television series
American Broadcasting Company original programming
Black-and-white American television shows
English-language television shows
Television series about journalism
Television series by Warner Bros. Television Studios
Television series set in the 1920s
Television shows set in New York City